Winton Hills is a neighborhood in Cincinnati, Ohio. The population was 5,684 at the 2020 census.

History

Winton Terrace is a Cincinnati Metropolitan Housing Authority (CMHA) project built for low income Cincinnati citizens. It was the first housing project in Cincinnati. It opened in 1940 as white only and did not take African American families. African Americans were not allowed until the late 1950s, but only because CMHA had built another white only project next door to Winton Terrace, named Findlater Gardens.

References

Neighborhoods in Cincinnati
African-American history in Cincinnati